Saladillo may refer to:
Saladillo, Buenos Aires, a town in Buenos Aires Province, Argentina
Saladillo, Córdoba, a municipality in San Luis Province in Argentina
Saladillo, San Luis, a municipality in San Luis Province in central Argentina
Saladillo Partido, a partido of Buenos Aires Province in Argentina
Saladillo River, a river of Argentina
Saladillo Stream, a stream of the Paraná River, in the province of Santa Fe, Argentina